Syndactyly-nystagmus syndrome due to 2q31.1 microduplication, also known as 2q31.1 microduplication syndrome, is a rare genetic disorder characterized by syndactyly affecting the third-fourth fingers and bilateral congenital nystagmus.

Signs and symptoms 

The following list comprises most of the symptoms shown by individuals with this condition:

 Short stature
 Congenital bilateral pendular nystagmus
 Shortening of the radius
 Shortening of the ulna
 Shortening of the tibia
 Shortening of the fibula
 Congenital syndactyly of the fourth to fifth fingers of the hand.

Less common symptoms include:

 Congenital clubfoot
 Complex hand anomalies
 Hypoplastic, triphalangeal thumbs

Complications 

There are usually no complications associated with this condition, although the limb shortening and hand anomalies might cause other psychological complications such as social insecurity.

Genetics 

This condition is caused by a 1 to 3.8 mb duplication of genetic material on the long arm of chromosome 2, more specifically, a location known as 2q31.1

Diagnosis 

For one to be diagnosed with this condition, they have to be physically examined and genetically tested.

Epidemiology 

Only 6 cases from 2 families in Korea and France have been described in medical literature.

See also 

 Duplication (genetics)

References 

Rare genetic syndromes
Autosomal duplications
Autosomal dominant disorders